Ksenia Pervak was the defending champion, but is still competing at Wimbledon. 
Edina Gallovits-Hall defeated Stéphanie Foretz Gacon in the final 6–4, 6–3.

Seeds

Main draw

Finals

Top half

Bottom half

References
 Main Draw
 Qualifying Draw

Bella Cup - Singles